The library system of the Massachusetts Institute of Technology (MIT Libraries) covers all five academic schools comprising the university. The print and multimedia collections of the MIT Libraries include more than 5 million items, with over 3 million volumes of print material, 17,000 journal and other serial subscriptions, 478 online databases, over 55,000 electronic journal titles licensed for access, and over 2.8 million items in collections of microforms, maps, images, musical scores, sound recordings, and videotapes.

The MIT library was established in 1862 with a gift of seven volumes, three years before classes began. The MIT Libraries are four divisional libraries: Hayden (Science and Humanities), Barker Engineering, Dewey (social sciences and management), and Rotch (architecture and planning). The divisional libraries are open seven days a week and offer hours that extend well into the evening.  Hayden, Barker, and Dewey Libraries feature 24/7 study rooms to accommodate MIT students around the clock.

In addition to the divisional libraries, there are a few smaller libraries that serve specialized fields: the Lewis Music Library, the GIS & Data Lab, the Aga Khan Documentation Center, Visual Collections, and the Physics Reading Room. The Lewis Music Library houses the MIT Music Oral History Project. The Department of Distinctive Collections (previously the Institute Archives and Special Collections) contains materials documenting MIT’s history, and the Library Storage Annex, located off-campus, houses materials that can be requested and available for use the next business day.

The Libraries also manage DSpace, a digital repository created to capture, preserve, and share MIT's intellectual output with the world.  DSpace at MIT currently houses over 21,000 MIT theses.

Publications 
Bibliotech: MIT Libraries' Newsletter (semi-annual; past issues)
MIT Libraries News
What's the Score? Newsletter of the MIT Music Library

References

External links
Powers, Elia.  "Standing Up for Open Access." Inside Higher Ed. (2007-05-21). Retrieved on 2007-11-15.
"Celebrating Research" Rare and Special Collections from the Membership of the Association of Research Libraries: Massachusetts Institute of Technology Libraries. (2007-09-23). Retrieved on 2007-11-15.
MIT Libraries website
Barker Engineering
Dewey Management and Social Sciences
Document Services
Hayden Circulation
Institute Archives and Special Collections
Lewis Music
Library Storage Annex
Rotch Architecture and Planning
MIT Libraries: MIT Facts 2007
MIT Course Catalogue 2007-2008, Bulletin

Massachusetts Institute of Technology buildings
Libraries in Massachusetts
Education in Cambridge, Massachusetts
1862 establishments in Massachusetts
Libraries in Middlesex County, Massachusetts
Libraries